McLeland is a surname. Notable people with the surname include:

Albert McLeland, American football and basketball coach
Joe McLeland (born 1946), American politician
Wayne McLeland (1924–2004), American baseball player

See also
McClelland